1889 Central Cumberland colonial by-election may refer to 

 1889 Central Cumberland colonial by-election 1 held on 22 June 1889
 1889 Central Cumberland colonial by-election 2 held on 28 September 1889

See also
 List of New South Wales state by-elections